Trancoso is a city and a municipality in Portugal. The city (cidade) population is about 3.000.

The municipality is located in the District of Guarda, Region Centro, sub-region Beira Interior Norte.

The present Mayor is Amilcar Salvador. The municipal holiday is May 29. Principal monument: Castle of Trancoso. The municipality is served by the Vila Franca das Naves train station on the Beira Alta line from Pampilhosa to the Spanish border.

Trancoso is well known as the place where the 16th-century poet and shoemaker António Gonçalves de Bandarra lived and made his prophetic texts. A statue of him was erected in front of the city hall.

Trancoso is also the birthplace of Isaac Cardoso, born in 1603 or 1604. He was a renowned Jewish author, philosopher, and physicist. Cardoso died in Verona in 1683. His parents were members of the extensive Marrano community in Trancoso that left behind 300 Hebrew inscriptions. 700 Trancoso Jews were persecuted during the Inquisition.

Parishes
   
Administratively, the municipality is divided into 21 civil parishes (freguesias):

 Aldeia Nova
 Castanheira
 Cogula
 Cótimos
 Fiães
 Freches e Torres
 Granja
 Guilheiro
 Moimentinha
 Moreira de Rei
 Palhais
 Póvoa do Concelho
 Reboleiro
 Rio de Mel
 Trancoso (São Pedro e Santa Maria) e Souto Maior
 Tamanhos
 Torre do Terrenho, Sebadelhe da Serra e Terrenho
 Valdujo
 Vale do Seixo e Vila Garcia
 Vila Franca das Naves e Feital
 Vilares e Carnicães

Notable people 
 António Gonçalves de Bandarra (1500 in Trancoso - 1556) a Portuguese writer and shoemaker
 Isaac Cardoso (1603/4 at Trancoso - 1683) a Jewish physician, philosopher and polemic writer.
 Eduarda Lapa (1895 in Trancoso — 1976) a painter and painting teacher, specialized in naturalist still lifes

Gallery

References

External links
Municipality official website

Municipalities of Guarda District
Cities in Portugal